WaveGroup Sound is a music production company known for its creation of music for numerous video games. Since 2014, WaveGroup has been the official sound design team for Facebook.

History
WaveGroup Sound was originally co-founded by engineer James Allen and musician Will Littlejohn in Brisbane, California, doing audio post production for film, commercials, and corporate training videos. WaveGroup relocated to the Silicon Valley in 1996, with Littlejohn later acquiring full ownership of the company. 

WaveGroup's work shifted to video game music and sound design, and by the early 2000s the company was the leading producer of music for interactive music video games, producing music for popular series like Karaoke Revolution, Rock Band, Guitar Hero, and others. 

WaveGroup's sound design work includes sounds for the Jawbone Era Bluetooth headset and JAMBOX Bluetooth speaker. The company also did Interactive Voice Response (IVR) work for major corporations such as American Express and Fidelity Investments and others.

WaveGroup produced in-app notification sounds for Facebook's Messenger, Slingshot, and Instagram Bolt instant messaging platforms, and in 2014 the company became Facebook's official in-house sound design team.

Partial music game portfolio
WaveGroup produced many or all of the songs or song covers for some of these video game titles.

 Beatmania (US) / Beatmania IIDX 11: IIDX RED (JP)
 Brooktown High
 Guitar Hero
 Guitar Hero II
 Guitar Hero Encore: Rocks the 80s
 Guitar Hero III: Legends of Rock
 Guitar Hero: Aerosmith
 Guitar Hero: On Tour
 Guitar Hero World Tour (DLC Only)
 Samba de Amigo
 Rock Band (DLC packs as well)
 Dance Dance Revolution Ultramix 4
 Dance Dance Revolution Universe
 Dance Dance Revolution Universe 3

Awards 
2005 Spike Video Game Awards - Best Soundtrack for Guitar Hero
2005 Game Developers Choice Awards - Best Audio for Guitar Hero
2006 AIAS Interactive Achievement Award for Outstanding Achievement in Soundtrack for Guitar Hero
2006 BAFTA Games Awards - Soundtrack for Guitar Hero
2006 Spike Video Game Awards - Best Soundtrack for Guitar Hero II
2006 Game Developers Choice Awards - Best Audio for Guitar Hero II
2007 Spike Video Game Awards - Best Soundtrack for Rock Band

References

External links
Spike TV 2006 Video Game Awards
Company press release
Company produced live action QuickTime of studio's Guitar Hero II work process

Facebook